Wilbert Haslip (born December 8, 1956) is a former American football running back. He played for the Kansas City Chiefs in 1979 and for the Los Angeles Express in 1983.

References

1956 births
Living people
American football running backs
Hawaii Rainbow Warriors football players
Kansas City Chiefs players
Los Angeles Express players